The 2020 French Open – Men's Singles Qualifying was a series of tennis matches which took place 21–25 September 2020 to determine the sixteen qualifiers into the main draw of the 2020 French Open. Three players also qualified as lucky losers.

Seeds

Qualifiers

Lucky losers

Draw

First qualifier

Second qualifier

Third qualifier

Fourth qualifier

Fifth qualifier

Sixth qualifier

Seventh qualifier

Eighth qualifier

Ninth qualifier

Tenth qualifier

Eleventh qualifier

Twelfth qualifier

Thirteenth qualifier

Fourteenth qualifier

Fifteenth qualifier

Sixteenth qualifier

References 
Qualifying Draw

Men's Singles Qualifying
French Open - Men's Singles Qualifying
French Open by year – Qualifying